"Ximeromata" (English: "Daybreaks") is a Greek contemporary laïko–pop song by Konstantinos Argyros. It was officially released on 15 June 2017 and peaked #1 in the Greek Airplay and Digital Singles Chart at the same month of its release. The song was written and composed by Greek singer-songwriter Petros Iakovidis. It is the first official single from his sixth Greek studio album "To Kati Parapano" which was released on October 2, 2018.

Music video
The music video premiered on the official YouTube channel of Konstantinos Argiros, on June 15. The video was directed by Giannis Dimolitsas.

Charts

Release history

References 

2017 singles
Greek songs
2017 songs